Miss Caribbean UK is an Afro-Caribbean beauty pageant held in the United Kingdom. It was created by Clayton Brown and Jacqui Brown in 2014. The stated aims of the pageant are to promote, educate, inspire and celebrate the historical and cultural impact of the Caribbean within the United Kingdom. The organisation has adopted the slogan "Positively Promoting the Caribbean"™, aiming to inspire, inform and unite all the different Caribbean countries under one umbrella. The event uses a pageant to promote, educate, inspire and celebrate the historical and cultural impact of the Caribbean within the United Kingdom. The Patron is Barrister and TV personality Shaun Wallace.  

The current Miss Caribbean UK titleholder is Farrah Grant representing Turks and Caicos Islands. She was crowned on 28th November 2020 at the Tudor Rose, London.

Miss Caribbean UK 2014
 

The first Miss Caribbean UK Grand Finalé was held on 30 November 2014 at the Tabernacle, Notting Hill.

Eight contestants took part in four rounds including an introduction with Caribbean Carnival costumes, a swimwear round (which was removed the following year), an evening gown round and a round of interview questions.  All evening gowns were designed by AgyeFrance

Results

Top Finalists
 Winner - Miss Keeleigh Griffith representing Barbados
 1st Runner up - Miss Kimhia Toussaint representing Saint Lucia
 2nd Runner up - Miss Ayesha Williams representing Jamaica

Category Winners
 Miss Website Queen - Miss Ayesha Williams representing Jamaica
 Miss Personality  - Miss Jamilah Faucher representing Saint Lucia
 Miss Elegance - Miss Rheanne Kimberley Murray representing Jamaica
 Miss Swimwear – Miss Kimhia Toussaint representing Saint Lucia

Miss Caribbean UK 2015
 

The second Miss Caribbean UK Grand Finalé was held on 5 December 2015 at the Shaw Theatre.

Sixteen contestants took part in five rounds including an introduction in the form of a showcase in full Caribbean Carnival costumes, a traditional wear round (which replaced the swimwear round from the previous year), a cocktail dress round, an evening gown round and a round of interview questions.

Results

Top Finalists
 Winner - Miss Amy Harris-Willock representing Antigua
 1st Runner up - Miss Selina Chippy representing Jamaica
 2nd Runner up - Miss Nicole Renwick representing Jamaica

Category Winners
 People's Champion - Miss Selina Chippy representing Jamaica
 Miss Personality  - Miss Rochelle Barrett representing Barbados
 Best Evening Gown - Miss Amy Harris-Willock representing Antigua - designed by AgyeFrance

Miss Caribbean UK 2016

The third Miss Caribbean UK Grand Finalé was held on 3 December 2016 at the Broadway Theatre, Catford. 
Thirteen contestants showcased one of their many talents with a fantastic choreographed opening dance section, which had a surprise ending with the founders joining the girls onstage and dancing to a few bars of the "electric Boogie". They also took part in an evening gown round and a round of interview questions.

Results

Top Finalists
 Winner - Miss Jodie Hodgson representing Barbados
 1st Runner up - Miss Tahmar Arayomi representing Jamaica
 2nd Runner up - Miss Cheniel Henderson representing Jamaica

Category Winners
 People's Champion - Miss Tanya Rose Brown representing Jamaica
 Miss Personality - Miss Atlanta Cousins-Robinson representing Jamaica
 Best Evening Gown - Miss Atlanta Cousins-Robinson representing Jamaica

Miss Caribbean UK 2017

The fourth Miss Caribbean UK Grand Finalé was held on 25 November 2017 at the Broadway Theatre, Catford.

Nine contestants competed for the Miss Caribbean crown at Broadway Theatre.  Choreographed by Kloe Dean, the show this year had a classier look, was well organised and well produced and was very well attended, with an energetic crowd who enjoyed a night of Caribbean culture and entertainment.

Results

Top Finalists
 Winner: - Elizabeth Williams – representing Grenada
 1st Runner Up: - Santrece Stewart – Representing Jamaica
 2nd Runner Up: Carissma Griffiths – Representing Jamaica

Category Winners
 Best Evening Dress: Elizabeth Williams - designed by AgyeFrance
 People’s Choice: Rianna Patterson
 Miss Personality: Eshiva Wright

NB: The title was assumed by the first Runner-Up; Miss Santrece Stewart

Miss Caribbean UK 2018

The fifth Miss Caribbean UK Grand Finalé was held on 24 November 2018 at the Greenwood Theatre, London bridge

Eight contestants competed for the Miss Caribbean crown at the Greenwood Theatre, London Bridge, a much more central location with greater accessibility from all locations. Choreographed by Kloe Dean, the show was vibrant and spectacular.  This year’s event, as with previous years, was very well attended, with a diverse audience from across the UK, who enjoyed a fantastic night of Caribbean culture and entertainment.

Results

Top Finalists
 Winner and new Miss Caribbean UK Queen: Tamera Farquharson-Ellis – rep St Kitts and Nevis
 1st Runner Up: - Mosique Daly-Vidal– Representing Dominica
 2nd Runner Up: Tabitha Barnett– Representing Guyana

Category Winners
 Best Evening Dress: Tamera Farquharson-Ellis, designed by Devon Inspirations
 People’s Choice: Dhanitra Henry-Nangle
 Miss Personality: Tasha Lawson

Miss Caribbean UK 2019 

The sixth Annual Miss Caribbean UK Grand Finalé held on 9 November 2019 was another resounding success! Twelve contestants competed for this annual Caribbean event, which aims to highlight the ongoing positive impact that the Caribbean diaspora has made in the UK. Choreographed by Kloe Dean, the show was again held at the Greenwood theatre, London Bridge, a central location with greater accessibility from all locations.

Results

Top Finalists

 Winner and new Miss Caribbean UK     Queen: Sydonie Barrett – representing The Cayman Islands
 1st Runner Up: - Deearnie Felix,     representing Dominica
 2nd Runner Up: Dale Joseph,     representing St Lucia

Category Winners

 Best Evening Dress: Clarice     Stewart
 People’s Choice: Sydonie Barrett
 Miss Personality: Rene Thompson

Miss Caribbean UK 2020 

The seventh Annual Miss Caribbean UK Grand Finalé held on 28 November 2020 premiered ONLINE and was heavily impacted by the National lockdown due to the Covid-19 Pandemic. Nine contestants competed for this annual Caribbean event. Following Government restrictions, the show was held without an audience at The Tudor Rose, 68 The Green, Southall UB2 4BG.

Results

Top Finalists

 Winner and new Miss Caribbean UK     Queen: Farrah Grant – representing Turks and Caicos Islands
 1st Runner Up: - Ashlea Smith,     The Cayman Islands
 2nd Runner Up: Gernice Haynes,     representing Jamaica

Category Winners

 Best Evening Dress: Farrah Grant
 People’s Choice: Farrah Grant
 Miss Personality: Ashlea Smith

References

External links 

 

Caribbean British
Caribbean UK
Caribbean UK